The Rheintaler Höhenweg, or Rhine valley high path, is a hiking trail along the western side of the Rhine valley in Switzerland. It starts in Rorschach on the edge of Lake Constance, and follows the Rhine river southwards (upstream) through wine fields, fruit orchards and cheese-making countryside to finish in Sargans.

This route is not the same as the Rheinhöhenweg Trail, which is much farther north, downstream in Germany.

The route
The route can be split up into several stages, for example:

 From Rorschach to St. Margrethen
 St. Margrethen to Altstätten
 Altstätten to Sennwald
 Sennwald to Wildhaus
 Wildhaus to Malbun SG
 Malbun to Sargans

External links
 http://www.wanderland.ch/en/routen_detail.cfm?id=317983
 http://www.wandersite.ch/Rheintal.html

Hiking trails in Switzerland
Sargans